Nadine is the first EP by Irish recording artist Nadine Coyle, released on 22 March 2018 by Virgin EMI Records. After reuniting with Brian Higgins from production team Xenomania, new music from Nadine began development in 2014.

Background and development
In November 2010, Coyle released her debut studio album, Insatiable. Coyle collaborated with producers such as Toby Gad, Guy Chambers and William Orbit. Upon its release, the album received generally mixed to unfavourable reviews from music critics, and was met with limited commercial success due to an exclusive distribution through Tesco stores.

Wanting to release a potential follow-up record, Coyle announced that she and Brian Higgins of Xenomania had begun working on new material in 2014. In the following year, she confirmed that she was recording the album and that it would be released the same year, but production was halted and the album was never completed.

In July 2017, it was announced that Coyle had signed a recording deal with Virgin EMI Records, through which the EP was released.

Promotion
Prior to its release, Coyle had released a non-album single titled "Go to Work", which peaked at number 57 on the UK Downloads Chart and number 52 in Scotland. 

Nadine was announced on 5 February 2018, and its tracks were released bi-weekly leading up to its release date. In promotion of the EP, a concert tour consisting of seven dates was announced on the same day, but was later cancelled.

Critical reception
Lauren O'Neill of Noisey UK described the EP as "unabashed British pop" and has kept a "formula of relative timelessness" comparable to that of Girls Aloud's.

Track listing
All tracks produced by Xenomania and Commands.

Personnel
 Nadine Coyle – lead vocals, background vocals
 Xenomania – production
 COMMANDS – production

Release history

References

External links
Coyle's official website

2018 debut EPs
Nadine Coyle EPs
EPs by Irish artists
EPs by artists from Northern Ireland